Bride Flight is a 2008 romantic drama film about three women and one man from the Netherlands, who all start new lives in New Zealand. It starts with the victory of the KLM flight in the 1953 London to Christchurch air race. It was directed by Ben Sombogaart and stars Rutger Hauer, Elise Schaap, Anna Drijver, Karina Smulders and Waldemar Torenstra. The Dutch singer Ilse DeLange wrote and sang the title song for the movie: "Miracle".

Cast 
 Karina Smulders as Ada Van Holland
Pleuni Touw as Old Ada Van Holland
 Anna Drijver as Esther Cahn
Willeke van Ammelrooy as Old Esther Cahn
 Elise Schaap as Marjorie Mullin
Petra Laseur as Old Marjorie Mullin
 Waldemar Torenstra as Frank de Rooy
Rutger Hauer as Old Frank de Rooy
 Micha Hulshof as Derk Visser
 Mattijn Hartemink as Hans Doorman
 Walter Bart as Leon

Premise
A romantic drama that charts the lives of three women from different backgrounds forever changed when they emigrate to New Zealand as war brides.

References

External links 
 

2008 films
2008 romantic drama films
Aviation films
Dutch romantic drama films
Films based on actual events
Films directed by Ben Sombogaart
Films set in New Zealand
Films shot in New Zealand